Lopoke is a village in the Punjab province of Pakistan. It is located at 31°8'0N 72°50'0E with an altitude of 166 metres (547 feet).

References

Villages in Punjab, Pakistan